Tiffiny Elizabeth Hall (born 11 July 1984) is an Australian personal trainer, author, journalist and television personality best known from television appearances on Gladiators, the morning show The Circle (2010), The Biggest Loser Australia: Families (2011) and The Biggest Loser Australia: Singles (2012).

Background and education
Hall was born in Melbourne, Victoria to a Martin and a Jeanette Hall. She is the oldest of three siblings, Bridgette and Lleyton. She grew up in the suburb of Essendon. Her parents, Martin and Jeanette Hall, own a Taekwondo centre headquartered in Brunswick. Hall attended Lowther Hall Anglican Grammar School, where her English teacher was Australian writer John Marsden.

Hall graduated from the University of Melbourne in 2007 with a Bachelor of Arts (Media and Communications) majoring in creative writing and print journalism, and a Diploma in Modern Languages (French). Hall practises the Korean martial art of Taekwondo and is a Sixth Dan Black Belt. She is also a qualified personal trainer with a Certificate III & IV in Fitness and a Diploma of Sport Coaching with a specialisation in martial arts.

Career
After writing for the Herald Sun and freelancing for various magazines, Hall joined the cast of the Australian TV revival of Gladiators in 2008. Her Gladiator name was Angel.

In 2010, she joined morning television show The Circle as a regular health and fitness presenter and weightloss coach to host Chrissie Swan.

In 2011, Hall joined The Biggest Loser: Families as the newest addition to the full-time cast of trainers in the sixth season of the show. During the show's three months on air she wrote a blog at the official Biggest Loser website and a weekly column for the magazine OK!. Her second non-fiction book Weightloss Warrior: How to win the battle within was released in April 2011. Tiffiny returned to train the White Team in The Biggest Loser Singles for the 2012/13 series.

Hall released her third and fourth health books, Fatloss For Good and a cookbook called Lighten Up, in 2012.

In 2012 Hall released the children's novel White Ninja, the first in her Roxy Ran trilogy of children's books published by HarperCollins. The sequel Red Samurai was released in April 2013 and the third, titled Black Warrior, in March 2014.

In 2019, she and her husband released a book entitled "A First Time For Everything" which is about their first year as parents.

Personal life
In 2014, Hall married comedian, radio host, actor and film maker Ed Kavalee. In September 2017, Hall gave birth to their first child, Arnold. In May 2022, Hall gave to their second child, Vada.

In 2021, Hall announced she is suffering from Chronic Fatigue Syndrome, which she describes as having her whole body covered in cement.

References

External links
 Tiffiny Hall official website
 Fan site
 How To Weightloss 
Tiffiny Hall, profile at HarperCollins

Australian television presenters
1984 births
Living people
Television personalities from Melbourne
University of Melbourne alumni
Australian exercise and fitness writers
Australian exercise instructors
Australian health and wellness writers
Australian female taekwondo practitioners
Australian women television presenters
21st-century Australian women